International Movement for a Just World (JUST) is an international NGO based in Malaysia. It was founded by the social activist and academic Chandra Muzaffar, the current president.

References

External links
 
 

International human rights organizations
Non-profit organisations based in Malaysia
Organizations with year of establishment missing 
Human rights in Malaysia